Giancarlo Gutierrez (born 11 July 1932) is an Italian equestrian. He competed in two events at the 1956 Summer Olympics.

References

External links
 

1932 births
Living people
Italian male equestrians
Olympic equestrians of Italy
Equestrians at the 1956 Summer Olympics
Sportspeople from Cagliari
20th-century Italian people